Akshay Bhatia (born January 31, 2002) is an American professional golfer.

Amateur career
Bhatia was born in Northridge, California, and lives in Wake Forest, North Carolina. He was runner-up at the 2018 U.S. Junior Amateur. He won two silver medals at the 2018 Summer Youth Olympics in the boy's individual and the mixed team with Lucy Li. He played on the Junior Presidents Cup team in 2017 and Junior Ryder Cup in 2018, with both teams winning.

Bhatia made his PGA Tour debut at the 2019 Valspar Championship on a sponsorship exemption; he did, however, miss the cut.

Bhatia made his Web.com Tour debut on April 18, 2019, at the Robert Trent Jones Golf Trail Championship, where he made the cut and finished T-42.

Professional career
Bhatia turned professional in September 2019 after competing in the 2019 Walker Cup, and made his professional debut at the Sanderson Farms Championship.

On August 5, 2020, Bhatia won the ST 11 @ Old South Golf, an event on the Swing Thought Tour, by three strokes. On February 25, 2021, Bhatia won his second Swing Thought Tour event, ST 12 @ Brunswick, in a playoff. On May 29, Bhatia won the 2021 Biggs Classic, a GProTour event.

In June 2021, Bhatia qualified for the U.S. Open at Torrey Pines. He made the cut and finished tied for 57th in his first major championship appearance.

In January 2022, Bhatia won The Bahamas Great Exuma Classic on the Korn Ferry Tour. This was his first start as a member of the Korn Ferry Tour. Despite the strong start, Bhatia fell short of earning a PGA Tour card, finishing 30th during the regular season and not making a cut during the Finals.

Bhatia earned Special Temporary Member status on the PGA Tour after a runner-up finish at the 2023 Puerto Rico Open.

Amateur wins
2016 AJGA - CJGT Junior at Yorba Linda, IZOD AJGA Championship
2017 Davis Love III Junior Open, Junior PGA Championship, AJGA Junior at Ford's Colony
2018 Junior Invitational at Sage Valley, Polo Golf Junior Classic, Boy's Junior PGA Championship, Rolex Tournament of Champions
2019 Jones Cup Invitational, Dustin Johnson World Junior Championship

Source:

Professional wins (4)

Korn Ferry Tour wins (1)

Swing Thought Tour wins (2)
2020 ST 11 @ Old South Golf
2021 ST 12 @ Brunswick

GProTour wins (1)
2021 Biggs Classic

Results in major championships

"T" = tied

U.S. national team appearances
Junior Presidents Cup: 2017 (winners)
Junior Ryder Cup: 2018 (winners)
Walker Cup: 2019 (winners)

Source:

References

External links

American male golfers
Golfers at the 2018 Summer Youth Olympics
Golfers from California
Golfers from North Carolina
Left-handed golfers
People from Northridge, Los Angeles
People from Wake Forest, North Carolina
2002 births
Living people